St. Brendan Catholic Church is a Catholic church in the Roman Catholic Archdiocese of Los Angeles, located in the Windsor Square section of Los Angeles, California. The current Gothic Revival-style church was built in 1927 and has also served as a location for various Hollywood productions.

Early history
St. Brendan was formed as a new parish in 1914 under the leadership of Father William Forde.  The parish was initially dubbed the "baby" parish, and in 1915 Father Forde told the Los Angeles Times: "The growth of the 'baby' parish of the diocese has been remarkable.  New families are moving in every day.  The whole community is alive and developing rapidly.  The congregation is enthusiastic and hopeful of great things in the future."

New church built in 1927

The parish opened a parochial grammar school in 1915 on Western Avenue, which still operates at that location.  In 1927, the parish built the large brownstone Gothic church that has been used by the parish for more than 90 years.  At the time of the new church's dedication in January 1928, the Los Angeles Times noted that the "beautiful" new church had cost $400,000, and reported: "The new building is in the Old English Gothic style and is considered one of the handsomest structures of its kind in California."  Designed by architect Emmett Martin, the church has been called "one of the archdiocese's architectural gems."

Consecration
In 1957, Archbishop Timothy Manning honored St. Brendan by consecrating it in a three-hour service.  Consecration raises a church to the highest order, which may never be transferred for common or profane use.  St. Brendan was one of only six churches in Los Angeles to reach that level.  As part of the consecration ceremony, a relic of the 6th century St. Brendan was taken in a procession through the church and then sealed into the altar.

Location in Films, Television Shows, and Music Videos
Located near the Hollywood studios, St. Brendan's gothic structure has proved a popular setting, appearing in the following productions.

 The St. Brendan Church Boys Choir (also known as the Bob Mitchell Boys Choir) 1936- 2000 was featured on radio and in over 100 films.
 In the Our Gang short Pups Is Pups (1930), Wheezer is reunited with his lost puppies outside the doors of St. Brendan.
 In War of the Worlds (1953), the climactic scene in which desperate humans gather to pray for a miracle inside St. Brendan while Martian ships blast away outside.
Armageddon (1998). In an apparent nod to War of the Worlds, the lead characters played by Liv Tyler and Ben Affleck are married at St. Brendan at the end of the movie.
 In November Rain by Guns N Roses (1991) the wedding scenes between Stephanie Seymour and Axl Rose.
 In Fight Club (1999) the narrator attends a support meeting for cancer victims at the church.
Spider-Man 3 (2007)
Stand Up Guys (2012), Val goes to confession at the church.

St. Brendan also appears in the following television shows (TV movie and series episodes):
The Fugitive (series 1963 - 1967), epilog scene in episode "Angels Travel on Lonely Roads" part 2
Congratulations, It’s a Boy! (1971 TV Movie)
Castle (series 2009-2016) “Always” (2012) and “Hunt” (2013)
Mod Squad (series 1968-1973) “Keep The Faith Baby” (1969)
The Fugitive (series 1963-1967) “Angels Travel On Lonely Roads” parts 1 and 2 (1964)
Falcon Crest (series 1981-1990) “For Better, For Worst” (1984) and “Love’s Triumph” (1984)
Beverly Hills 90210 (series 1990-2000) “Class of Beverly Hills” (1990)
CSI Miami (series 2002-2012) “From The Grave” (2005)
Monk (series 2002-2009) “Mr. Monk Is The Best Man” (2009)
Murder She Wrote (series 1984-1996) “Murder Through The Looking Glass” (1988)
Desperate Housewives (series 2004-2012) “There’s Something About A War” (2006)
Columbo (series 1971-2003) “Undercover” (1994)

See also
 Our Lady of the Angels Pastoral Region

Notes

External links

 St. Brendan's official web site

Roman Catholic churches completed in 1927
Roman Catholic churches in California
Education in Los Angeles
Private elementary schools in California
Catholic elementary schools in California
Roman Catholic churches in Los Angeles
20th-century Roman Catholic church buildings in the United States